Foreign Born was an American folk rock band. 

It was formed in San Francisco during the late summer months of 2003, but soon relocated to Los Angeles. The band self-released its first 12" single ("We Had Pleasure" b/w "Escape"), and then its first EP In the Remote Woods through StarTime International Records. While touring the US and UK with Rogue Wave, Jason Collett, Cold War Kids, Giant Drag and We Are Scientists, Foreign Born recorded its first full-length album, On the Wing Now, in fall and winter 2005, and self-released 500 or so copies that were sold on the tours, and officially released the album with Dim Mak on August 21, 2007. The band appeared in Spin magazine in October 2007. Another album, Person to Person, was released on June 23, 2009, by the Secretly Canadian record label. 
In August 2011, the band had stopped working.

Television
The band played in the nightclub scene during the pilot episode of Chuck as well as the bar scene of the pilot episode of  Reaper.

References

External links
Secretly Canadian - the band's record label
Foreign Born on Myspace
Foreign Born interview at StereoSubversion.com

Folk rock groups from California
Secretly Canadian artists